Vladimir Ilyich class is a class of Russian river passenger ships. It is named after the first ship of the class Vladimir Ilyich.

Four-deck cruise ships manufactured in Germany, 1974–1983.

River cruise ships of the German Project 301 / BiFa125M

Overview

See also
 List of river cruise ships
 Anton Chekhov-class motorship
 Baykal-class motorship
 Dmitriy Furmanov-class motorship
 Maksim Gorkiy-class motorship
 Oktyabrskaya Revolyutsiya-class motorship
 Rodina-class motorship
 Rossiya-class motorship (1952)
 Rossiya-class motorship (1973)
 Sergey Yesenin-class motorship
 Valerian Kuybyshev-class motorship
 Yerofey Khabarov-class motorship

References

River cruise ships
Ships of Russia
Ships of the Soviet Union
East Germany–Soviet Union relations